The 2011 Armor All Bathurst 12 Hour was an endurance race for FIA GT3 cars, Australian GT Championship cars, Group 3E Series Production Cars and other invited vehicles. The event, which was staged at the Mount Panorama Circuit, Bathurst, New South Wales, Australia on 6 February 2011, was the ninth running of the Bathurst 12 Hour, and the fifth since the race was revived in 2007.

The race saw GT cars return to long distance racing at Mount Panorama for the first time since the 2003 Bathurst 24 Hour. The addition of the faster GT3 entries saw the leading cars smash the previous distance record by 29 laps. Unfortunately it also saw many of the Class D and E cars not compete due to being reduced from outright contenders in previous races to class contenders for 2011. One of the  reason's for including the GT cars was an attempt to not only increase manufacturer involvement in the race but to also raise the international profile of the event and attract the top FIA GT3 teams.

The race was won by Audi's official factory supported team Audi Sport which was run by Audi's Le Mans 24 Hour team, Joest Racing, under the banners of "Audi Australia" for car #7 and "Audi Top Service" for car #8. Running a pair of Audi R8 LMS GT3s, the team of Marc Basseng, Christopher Mies and Darryl O'Young (#8) lead home teammates Mark Eddy, Craig Lowndes and Warren Luff (#7) in a 1-2 finish, the cars crossing the line only 0.7141 seconds apart in a true racing finish. Lowndes fastest race lap of 2:09.0861 also set a new GT lap record for Mt Panorama, cutting a second from the time of 2:10.0277 set 16 months earlier by Tony Quinn driving an Aston Martin DBRS9. Lowndes time came within 0.6210 of his Team Vodafone teammate Jamie Whincup's outright lap record of 2:08.4651 set in a Ford BF Falcon V8 Supercar in 2007. The Joest Racing R8's finished one lap in front of the VIP Pet Foods Racing Porsche 997 GT3 Cup R of Craig Baird and father and son pairing Tony and Klark Quinn.

The race was run under international endurance rules meaning that all cars compulsory pit stops were each to be no less than 90 seconds in duration. The Class A cars had to make 12 compulsory stops with no less than 10 laps between each stop while Class B cars only had to make 9 compulsory stops.

Class structure
Cars competed in the following classes:
 Class A – FIA GT3, Australian GT Championship
 Class B – Australian GT Challenge
 Class C – Australian GT Production
 Class D – Production (High Performance All Wheel Drive)
 Class E – Production (High Performance Rear Wheel Drive)
 Class F – Production (Performance)

For the race thin entries saw Classes D and E merged into Class D and Class F became the new Class E. There were several other classes listed in the regulations that attracted no entries.

Official results
Those in Bold represent class winners. Fastest Laps in Italics represent the class fastest lap.

Statistics
 Pole Position - #7 Mark Eddy, Craig Lowndes, Warren Luff
 Fastest Lap  -  #7 Craig Lowndes - 2:09.0861 (GT lap record) on lap 267

* Grid positions were taken on the lap average of the fastest times set by all drivers in a car, e.g Steve Owen set the fastest time of all cars with a GT qualifying record of 2:09.1015 in his Porsche 997 GT3 Cup S but the times of co-drivers James and Theo Koundouris averaged out to start the car 3rd behind the two Joest Racing Audi R8 LMS GT3's. Warren Luff had the overall 2nd fastest qualifying time in his Audi R8 (2:09.6360) but the times of co-drivers Mark Eddy and Craig Lowndes saw the #7 car start from pole position.

* Craig Lowndes fastest race lap in the #7 Audi, set on lap 267 of 292 when the car had already covered 1,652km, was not only a new GT lap record for the Mt Panorama Circuit but undercut the Owen's qualifying record by 0.0154 seconds.

References

External links
 Official website

Motorsport in Bathurst, New South Wales
Armor All Bathurst 12 Hour